The 2010 Milan–San Remo was the 101st running of the Milan–San Remo cycling race, held on 20 March. The race was won by Óscar Freire of Spain in a bunch sprint finish.

Teams 
There were 25 teams competing in the 2010 Milan–San Remo. Each team started with eight riders, making a starting peloton of 200. They are:

Results

References

Milan–San Remo
Milan-Sanremo
Milan - San Remo, 2010
Milan-Sanremo
2010 in road cycling